Interventional pulmonology (IP, also called interventional pulmonary medicine) is a maturing medical sub-specialty from its parent specialty of pulmonary medicine. It deals specifically with minimally invasive endoscopic and percutaneous procedures for diagnosis and treatment of neoplastic as well as non-neoplastic diseases of the airways, lungs, and pleura. Many IP procedures constitute efficacious yet less invasive alternatives to thoracic surgery.

History 
Before the advent of optical fibers and advances in anesthesiology, interventional pulmonary procedures were mostly limited to foreign body retrieval via rigid bronchoscopy. Gustav Killian (June 2, 1860 – February 24, 1921), a German laryngologist, performed foreign body retrievals from bronchial passages using a rigid laryngoscope/bronchoscope whereas in the United States, Chevalier Jackson (1865 – 1958) was the first to use the rigid bronchoscope. Later, Swedish internist Hans-Christian Jacobaeus first introduced thoracoscopy in a 1910 paper published in the journal Münch med Wochenschr, before Japanese thoracic surgeon Shiketo Ikeda (1925 – 2001) introduced the fiberoptic bronchoscope in the late 20th century. Jean-Francois Dumon from France is credited with modernizing rigid bronchoscopy in the late 20th century by introducing a novel non-metallic airway stent made of silicone, appropriately named the Dumon stent. Together, these developments laid the foundation for most of today’s interventional pulmonary techniques. 

In 1978, Kopen Wang and colleagues at Johns Hopkins Hospital described the use of transbronchial needle aspiration (TBNA) through a rigid bronchoscope to diagnose a paratracheal mediastinal mass. Following the advent of endobronchial ultrasound (EBUS), which first became available in the early 21st century, EBUS-TBNA swiftly replaced mediastinoscopy as the first-line in mediastinal staging for lung cancer. With these developments, interventional pulmonology became much more firmly established on the map of distinct subspecialties. 

In 1992, the Association for Bronchology and Interventional Pulmonology (AABIP) was formed as a representative society of interventional pulmonologists based in North America. This organization also publishes a journal, namely the Journal of Bronchology and Interventional Pulmonology. The World Association for Bronchology was founded by Dr. Ikeda in 1978 and renamed as the World Association for Bronchology and Interventional Pulmonology (WABIP) in 2010. It holds a biennial scientific meeting known as the World Congress for Bronchology and Interventional Pulmonology. The Association for Interventional Pulmonology Program Directors (AIPPD), dedicated to the advancement of IP education in the United States, was created in 2012.

Procedures 
In addition to basic bronchoscopic and pleural procedures that are performed by a general pulmonologist, an interventional pulmonologist may perform the following advanced procedures:

Advanced diagnostic procedures 
 Endobronchial ultrasound (EBUS) – curvilinear and radial. EBUS allows mediastinal visualization and sampling via transbronchial nodal aspiration (TBNA). This is an important alternative to mediastinoscopy, a significantly more invasive thoracic surgical procedure
 Endoscopic ultrasound (EUS) in the esophagus. This can also be used for mediastinal visualization and sampling via TBNA
 Electromagnetic navigational biopsy (ENB). This is used for localization and sampling of peripheral lung lesions
 Cryobiopsy. This is an increasingly recognized less invasive alternative to surgical lung biopsy for diagnosis of interstitial lung disease
 Medical pleuroscopy for inspection and biopsy. This procedure, performed under conscious sedation without the need for subsequent hospitalization, offers a less invasive alternative to video-assisted thoracoscopic surgery (VATS)
 Pleural biopsy – closed or ultrasound-guided
 Trans-thoracic sampling of a peripheral lung lesion

Advanced therapeutic procedures 
 Percutaneous tracheostomy, a procedure performed at the bedside that offers a less invasive alternative to surgical tracheotomy
 Transtracheal oxygen catheter placement
 Rigid bronchoscopy
 Airway dilatation for stenosis
 Airway tumor ablation – involving microdebridement, hot therapies (e.g. argon plasma coagulation, laser fulguration, electrocautery, and photodynamic therapy), and cold therapies (e.g. cryotherapy)
 Other lesion debulking procedures e.g. microdebridement
 Airway stenting – using metallic and non-metallic (e.g. silicone) stents
 Endobronchial brachytherapy
 Intra-tumoral chemotherapy or ablative therapy
 Endobronchial valve placement. This can be performed for persistent post-operative air leaks and also for bronchoscopic lung volume reduction (BLVR), a less invasive alternative to lung volume reduction surgery (LVRS)
 Bronchial thermoplasty for asthma
 Whole lung lavage, the standard treatment for pulmonary alveolar proteinosis
 Tunneled pleural catheter placement. This enables patients to self-manage their chronic pleural effusion (malignant or non-malignant)
 Chemical pleurodesis  - either via chest tube instillation of the sclerosing agent (slurry) or instillation via medical pleuroscopy (poudrage)
 Percutaneous endoscopic gastrostomy (PEG) tube placement

Training and certification 
For purposes of formal training in interventional pulmonology, dedicated training programs only became available in the early 21st century. The first dedicated program was a 12-month advanced fellowship offered by Dr. Beamis at Lahey Clinic in Boston. Currently, there are over 30 IP fellowship programs across the country. However, training programs have varied considerably in terms of the breadth and depth of procedural training that they offer. 

To address the issue of inconsistent IP training across fellowship programs, representative members from five professional organizations (AABIP, AIPPD, ACCP, ATS, and APCCMPD) jointly published a list of minimum standards required by July 2019 in order for IP fellowship programs to receive formal accreditation from the AABIP and AIPPD.

To be eligible for this fellowship, applicants must first complete a three-year fellowship in pulmonary & critical care medicine. Most of these programs select one to two fellow(s) per year, applying though the Interventional Pulmonary Fellow Application Service (IPFAS©). As with most other medical specialties and subspecialties across the United States, applicants are matched to programs through the National Resident Matching Program (NRMP, or the “Match”).

References

External links 

 AABIP
 AIPPD
 Johns Hopkins Interventional Pulmonology
 WABIP

Pulmonology